Fred Baron may refer to:

 Fred Baron (footballer) (1901–1993), English footballer
 Fred Baron (lawyer) (1947–2008), American trial lawyer
 Fred Baron (producer) (born 1954), American film producer

See also
 Fred Barron (1879–1939), English football wing half
 Fred Barron (producer), American television producer, created My Family